Meysam Majidi (born 25 October 1986) is a retired Football player who mostly played as a defender.

Club career

Club career statistics

 Assist Goals

International career
Majidi was called up to the senior Iran squad for a 2018 FIFA World Cup qualifier against Guam in November 2015.

References

1986 births
Living people
Iranian footballers
People from Arak, Iran
Fajr Sepasi players
Aluminium Arak players
Aluminium Hormozgan F.C. players
Esteghlal Khuzestan players
Esteghlal F.C. players
Saba players
Al-Shamal SC players
Azadegan League players
Persian Gulf Pro League players
Qatari Second Division players
Iranian expatriate footballers
Iranian expatriate sportspeople in Qatar
Expatriate footballers in Qatar
Association football defenders